Bairro Craveiro Lopes is a subdivision of the city of Praia in the island of Santiago, Cape Verde. Its population was 1,519 at the 2010 census. It is situated northwest of the city centre. Adjacent neighbourhoods include Achadinha to the north, Fazenda to the east, Várzea to the south and Achada Eugénio Lima to the northwest.

References

Subdivisions of Praia